Andrea Piribauer is an Austrian para-alpine skier. She represented Austria at the 1992 Winter Paralympics and she won the bronze medal in the Women's Super-G B1-3 event. She also competed in the Women's Giant Slalom B1-3 event where she finished in 4th place.

See also 
 List of Paralympic medalists in alpine skiing

References 

Living people
Year of birth missing (living people)
Place of birth missing (living people)
Paralympic alpine skiers of Austria
Alpine skiers at the 1992 Winter Paralympics
Medalists at the 1992 Winter Paralympics
Paralympic bronze medalists for Austria
Paralympic medalists in alpine skiing
Austrian female alpine skiers
20th-century Austrian women